This list contains selected positive numbers in increasing order, including counts of things, dimensionless quantities and probabilities. Each number is given a name in the short scale, which is used in English-speaking countries, as well as a name in the long scale, which is used in some of the countries that do not have English as their national language.

 Mathematics – random selections: Approximately  is a rough first estimate of the probability that a typing "monkey", or an English-illiterate typing robot, when placed in front of a typewriter, will type out William Shakespeare's play Hamlet as its first set of inputs, on the precondition it typed the needed number of characters.  However, demanding correct punctuation, capitalization, and spacing, the probability falls to around 10−360,783.
 Computing: 2.2 is approximately equal to the smallest positive non-zero value that can be represented by an octuple-precision IEEE floating-point value.
1 is equal to the smallest positive non-zero value that can be represented by a quadruple-precision IEEE decimal floating-point value.
6.5 is approximately equal to the smallest positive non-zero value that can be represented by a quadruple-precision IEEE floating-point value.
3.6 is approximately equal to the smallest positive non-zero value that can be represented by an 80-bit x86 double-extended IEEE floating-point value.
1 is equal to the smallest positive non-zero value that can be represented by a double-precision IEEE decimal floating-point value.
4.9 is approximately equal to the smallest positive non-zero value that can be represented by a double-precision IEEE floating-point value.
1.5 is approximately equal to the probability that in a randomly selected group of 365 people, all of them will have different birthdays.
1 is equal to the smallest positive non-zero value that can be represented by a single-precision IEEE decimal floating-point value.

10−100 to 10−30

 Mathematics: The chances of shuffling a standard 52-card deck in any specific order is around 1.24 (or exactly )
 Computing: The number 1.4 is approximately equal to the smallest positive non-zero value that can be represented by a single-precision IEEE floating-point value.

10−30
(1000−10; short scale: one nonillionth; long scale: one quintillionth)

ISO: quecto- (q)

10−27
(1000−9; short scale: one octillionth; long scale: one quadrilliardth)

ISO: ronto- (r)

10−24
(1000−8; short scale: one septillionth; long scale: one quadrillionth)

ISO: yocto- (y)

10−21
(1000−7; short scale: one sextillionth; long scale: one trilliardth)

ISO: zepto- (z)
 Mathematics: The probability of matching 20 numbers for 20 in a game of keno is approximately 2.83 × 10−19.

10−18

(1000−6; short scale: one quintillionth; long scale: one trillionth)

ISO: atto- (a)

10−15
(1000−5; short scale: one quadrillionth; long scale: one billiardth)

ISO: femto- (f)

10−12
(1000−4; short scale: one trillionth; long scale: one billionth)

ISO: pico- (p)

10−9
(1000−3; short scale: one billionth; long scale: one milliardth)

ISO: nano- (n)

10−6
(1000−2; long and short scales: one millionth)

ISO: micro- (μ)

 Mathematics – Poker: The odds of being dealt a royal flush in poker are 649,739 to 1 against, for a probability of 1.5.
 Mathematics – Poker: The odds of being dealt a straight flush (other than a royal flush) in poker are 72,192 to 1 against, for a probability of 1.4 (0.0014%).
 Mathematics – Poker: The odds of being dealt a four of a kind in poker are 4,164 to 1 against, for a probability of 2.4 (0.024%).

10−3
(0.001; 1000−1; one thousandth)

ISO: milli- (m)
 Mathematics – Poker: The odds of being dealt a full house in poker are 693 to 1 against, for a probability of 1.4 × 10−3 (0.14%).
 Mathematics – Poker: The odds of being dealt a flush in poker are 507.8 to 1 against, for a probability of 1.9 × 10−3 (0.19%).
 Mathematics – Poker: The odds of being dealt a straight in poker are 253.8 to 1 against, for a probability of 4 × 10−3 (0.39%).
 Physics: α = , the fine-structure constant.

10−2
(0.01; one hundredth)

ISO: centi- (c)
 Mathematics – Lottery: The odds of winning any prize in the UK National Lottery, with a single ticket, under the rules as of 2003, are 54 to 1 against, for a probability of about 0.018 (1.8%).
 Mathematics – Poker: The odds of being dealt a three of a kind in poker are 46 to 1 against, for a probability of 0.021 (2.1%).
 Mathematics – Lottery: The odds of winning any prize in the Powerball, with a single ticket, under the rules as of 2015, are 24.87 to 1 against, for a probability of 0.0402 (4.02%).
 Mathematics – Poker: The odds of being dealt two pair in poker are 21 to 1 against, for a probability of 0.048 (4.8%).

10−1
(0.1; one tenth)

ISO: deci- (d)
 Legal history: 10% was widespread as the tax raised for income or produce in the ancient and medieval period; see tithe.
 Mathematics – Poker: The odds of being dealt only one pair in poker are about 5 to 2 against (2.37 to 1), for a probability of 0.42 (42%).
 Mathematics – Poker: The odds of being dealt no pair in poker are nearly 1 to 2, for a probability of about 0.5 (50%).

100

(1; one)
 Demography: The population of Monowi, an incorporated village in Nebraska, United States, was one in 2010.
 Religion: One is the number of gods in Judaism, Christianity, and Islam (monotheistic religions).
 Computing – Unicode: One character is assigned to the Lisu Supplement Unicode block, the fewest of any public-use Unicode block as of Unicode 14.0 (2021).
 Mathematics:  ≈ , the ratio of the diagonal of a square to its side length.
 Mathematics: φ ≈ , the golden ratio.
 Mathematics:  ≈ , the ratio of the diagonal of a unit cube.
 Mathematics: the number system understood by most computers, the binary system, uses 2 digits: 0 and 1.
Mathematics:  ≈ 2.236 067 9775, the correspondent to the diagonal of a rectangle whose side lengths are 1 and 2.
Mathematics:  + 1 ≈ , The ratio of smaller of the two quantities to the larger quantity is the same as the ratio of the larger quantity to the sum of the smaller quantity and twice the larger quantity.
 Mathematics: e ≈ , the base of the natural logarithm.
 Mathematics: the number system understood by ternary computers, the ternary system, uses 3 digits: 0, 1, and 2.
 Religion: three manifestations of God in the Christian Trinity.
 Mathematics: π ≈ , the ratio of a circle's circumference to its diameter.
 Religion: the Four Noble Truths in Buddhism. 
 Biology: 7 ± 2, in cognitive science, George A. Miller's estimate of the number of objects that can be simultaneously held in human working memory.
 Music: 7 notes in a major or minor scale.
 Astronomy: 8 planets in the Solar System.
 Religion: the Eightfold Path in Buddhism.
 Literature: 9 circles of Hell in the Inferno by Dante Alighieri.

101

(10; ten)

ISO: deca- (da)
 Demography: The population of Pesnopoy, a village in Bulgaria, was 10 in 2007.
 Human scale: There are 10 digits on a pair of human hands, and 10 toes on a pair of human feet.
 Mathematics: The number system used in everyday life, the decimal system, has 10 digits: 0, 1, 2, 3, 4, 5, 6, 7, 8, 9.
 Religion: the Ten Commandments in the Abrahamic religions.
 Music: The number of notes (12) in a chromatic scale.
 Astrology: There are 12 zodiac signs, each one representing part of the annual path of the sun's movement across the night sky.
 Computing – Microsoft Windows: Twelve successive consumer versions of Windows NT have been released as of December 2021.
 Music: The number (15) of completed, numbered string quartets by each of Ludwig van Beethoven and Dmitri Shostakovich.
 Linguistics: The Finnish language has fifteen noun cases. 
 Mathematics: The hexadecimal system, a common number system used in computer programming, uses 16 digits where the last 6 are usually represented by letters: 0, 1, 2, 3, 4, 5, 6, 7, 8, 9, A, B, C, D, E, F.
 Computing – Unicode: The minimum possible size of a Unicode block is 16 contiguous code points (i.e., U+abcde0 - U+abcdeF).
 Computing – UTF-16/Unicode: There are 17 addressable planes in UTF-16, and, thus, as Unicode is limited to the UTF-16 code space, 17 valid planes in Unicode.
 Science fiction: The 23 enigma plays a prominent role in the plot of The Illuminatus! Trilogy by Robert Shea and Robert Anton Wilson.
 Mathematics: e ≈ 23.140692633
 Music: a combined total of 24 major and minor keys, also the number of works in some musical cycles of J. S. Bach, Frédéric Chopin, Alexander Scriabin, and Dmitri Shostakovich. 
 Alphabetic writing: There are 26 letters in the Latin-derived English alphabet (excluding letters found only in foreign loanwords).
 Biology: Each human cell contains 46 chromosomes.
 Phonology: There are 47 phonemes in English phonology in Received Pronunciation.
 Syllabic writing: There are 49 letters in each of the two kana syllabaries (hiragana and katakana) used to represent Japanese (not counting letters representing sound patterns that have never occurred in Japanese).
 Chess: Either player in a chess game can claim a draw if 50 consecutive moves are made by each side without any captures or pawn moves.
 Demography: The population of Nassau Island, part of the Cook Islands, was around 78 in 2016.
 Syllabic writing: There are 85 letters in the modern version of the Cherokee syllabary.
 Music: There are 88 keys on a grand piano.
 Computing – ASCII: There are 95 printable characters in the ASCII character set.

102

(100; hundred)

ISO: hecto- (h)
 Music: There are 104 numbered symphonies of Franz Josef Haydn.
 European history: Groupings of 100 homesteads were a common administrative unit in Northern Europe and Great Britain (see Hundred (county division)).
 Religion: 108 is a sacred number in Hinduism.
 Chemistry: 118 chemical elements have been discovered or synthesized as of 2016.
 Computing – ASCII: There are 128 characters in the ASCII character set, including nonprintable control characters.
 Phonology: The Taa language is estimated to have between 130 and 164 distinct phonemes.
 Political Science: There were 193 member states of the United Nations as of 2011.
 Computing: A GIF image (or an 8-bit image) supports maximum 256 (=28) colors.
 Computing – Unicode: There are 320 different Unicode blocks as of Unicode 14.0 (2021).
 Aviation: 583 people died in the 1977 Tenerife airport disaster, the deadliest accident not caused by deliberate terrorist action in the history of civil aviation.
 Music: The highest number (626) in the Köchel catalogue of works of Wolfgang Amadeus Mozart.
 Demography: Vatican City, the least populous independent country, has an approximate population of 800 as of 2018.

103

(thousand)

ISO: kilo- (k)
 Demography: The population of Ascension Island is 1,122.
 Music: 1,128: number of known extant works by Johann Sebastian Bach recognized in the Bach-Werke-Verzeichnis as of 2017.
 Typesetting: 2,000–3,000 letters on a typical typed page of text.
 Mathematics: 2,520 (5×7×8×9 or 23×32×5×7) is the least common multiple of every positive integer under (and including) 10.
 Terrorism: 2,996 persons (including 19 terrorists) died in the terrorist attacks of September 11, 2001.
 Biology: the DNA of the simplest viruses has 3,000 base pairs.
 Military history: 4,200 (Republic) or 5,200 (Empire) was the standard size of a Roman legion.
 Linguistics: Estimates for the linguistic diversity of living human languages or dialects range between 5,000 and 10,000. (SIL Ethnologue in 2009 listed 6,909 known living languages.)
Astronomy – Catalogues: There are 7,840 deep-sky objects in the NGC Catalogue from 1888.
 Lexicography: 8,674 unique words in the Hebrew Bible.

104
(ten thousand or a myriad)
 Biology: Each neuron in the human brain is estimated to connect to 10,000 others.
 Demography: The population of Tuvalu was 10,544 in 2007.
 Lexicography: 14,500 unique English words occur in the King James Version of the Bible.
Zoology: There are approximately 17,500 distinct butterfly species known.
 Language: There are 20,000–40,000 distinct Chinese characters in more than occasional use.
 Biology: Each human being is estimated to have 20,000 coding genes.
 Grammar: Each regular verb in Cherokee can have 21,262 inflected forms.
 War: 22,717 Union and Confederate soldiers were killed, wounded, or missing in the Battle of Antietam, the bloodiest single day of battle in American history.
 Computing – Unicode: 42,720 characters are encoded in CJK Unified Ideographs Extension B, the most of any single public-use Unicode block as of Unicode 14.0 (2021).
 Aviation: , 44,000+ airframes have been built of the Cessna 172, the most-produced aircraft in history.
 Computing - Fonts: The maximum possible number of glyphs in a TrueType or OpenType font is 65,535 (216-1), the largest number representable by the 16-bit unsigned integer used to record the total number of glyphs in the font.
 Computing – Unicode: A plane contains 65,536 (216) code points; this is also the maximum size of a Unicode block, and the total number of code points available in the obsolete UCS-2 encoding.
 Mathematics: 65,537 is the largest known Fermat prime.
 Memory: , the largest number of decimal places of π that have been recited from memory is 70,030.

105

(one hundred thousand or a lakh).
 Demography: The population of Saint Vincent and the Grenadines was 100,982 in 2009.
 Biology – Strands of hair on a head: The average human head has about 100,000–150,000 strands of hair.
 Literature: approximately 100,000 verses (shlokas)  in the Mahabharata.
 Computing – Unicode: 144,762 characters (including control characters) encoded in Unicode as of version 14.0 (2021).
 Language: 267,000 words in James Joyce's Ulysses.
 Computing – Unicode: 288,512 code points assigned to a Unicode block as of Unicode 14.0.
 Mathematics: 294,000 – The approximate number of entries in The On-Line Encyclopedia of Integer Sequences .
 Genocide: 300,000 people killed in the Rape of Nanking.
 Language – English words: The New Oxford Dictionary of English contains about 360,000 definitions for English words.
 Biology – Plants: There are approximately 390,000 distinct plant species known, of which approximately 20% (or 78,000) are in risk of extinction.
Biology – Flowers: There are approximately 400,000 distinct flower species on Earth.
 Literature: 564,000 words in War and Peace by Leo Tolstoy.
 Literature: 930,000 words in the King James Version of the Bible.
 Mathematics: There are 933,120 possible combinations on the Pyraminx.
 Computing – Unicode: There are 974,530 publicly-assignable code points (i.e., not surrogates, private-use code points, or noncharacters) in Unicode.

106

(10002; long and short scales: one million)

ISO: mega- (M)
 Demography: The population of Riga, Latvia was 1,003,949 in 2004, according to Eurostat.
 Computing – UTF-8: There are 1,112,064 (220 + 216 - 211) valid UTF-8 sequences (excluding overlong sequences and sequences corresponding to code points used for UTF-16 surrogates or code points beyond U+10FFFF).
 Computing – UTF-16/Unicode: There are 1,114,112 (220 + 216) distinct values encodable in UTF-16, and, thus (as Unicode is currently limited to the UTF-16 code space), 1,114,112 valid code points in Unicode (1,112,064 scalar values and 2,048 surrogates).
Ludology – Number of games: Approximately 1,181,019 video games have been created as of 2019.
 Biology – Species: The World Resources Institute claims that approximately 1.4 million species have been named, out of an unknown number of total species (estimates range between 2 and 100 million species). Some scientists give 8.8 million species as an exact figure.
 Genocide: Approximately 800,000–1,500,000 (1.5 million) Armenians were killed in the Armenian genocide.
 Linguistics: The number of possible conjugations for each verb in the Archi language is 1,502,839.
 Info: The freedb database of CD track listings has around 1,750,000 entries .
 War: 1,857,619 casualties at the Battle of Stalingrad.
 Computing – UTF-8: 2,164,864 (221 + 216 + 211 + 27) possible one- to four-byte UTF-8 sequences, if the restrictions on overlong sequences, surrogate code points, and code points beyond U+10FFFF are not adhered to.  (Note that not all of these correspond to unique code points.)
 Mathematics – Playing cards: There are 2,598,960 different 5-card poker hands that can be dealt from a standard 52-card deck.
 Mathematics: There are 3,149,280 possible positions for the Skewb.
Mathematics – Rubik's Cube: 3,674,160 is the number of combinations for the Pocket Cube (2×2×2 Rubik's Cube).
 Geography/Computing – Geographic places: The NIMA GEOnet Names Server contains approximately 3.88 million named geographic features outside the United States, with 5.34 million names. The USGS Geographic Names Information System claims to have almost 2 million physical and cultural geographic features within the United States.
 Computing - Supercomputer hardware: 4,981,760 processor cores in the final configuration of the Tianhe-2 supercomputer.
 Genocide: Approximately 5,100,000–6,200,000 Jews were killed in the Holocaust.

107

(a crore; long and short scales: ten million)
 Demography: The population of Haiti was 10,085,214 in 2010.
 Literature: 11,206,310 words in Devta by Mohiuddin Nawab, the longest continuously published story known in the history of literature.
 Genocide: An estimated 12 million persons shipped from Africa to the New World in the Atlantic slave trade.
 Mathematics: 12,988,816 is the number of domino tilings of an 8×8 checkerboard.
 War: 15 to 22 million casualties estimated as a result of World War I.
 Genocide/Famine: 15 million is an estimated lower bound for the death toll of the 1959–1961 Great Chinese Famine, the deadliest known famine in human history.
 Computing: 16,777,216 different colors can be generated using the hex code system in HTML (note that the trichromatic color vision of the human eye can only distinguish between about an estimated 1,000,000 different colors).
 Science Fiction: In Isaac Asimov's Galactic Empire, in 22,500 CE, there are 25,000,000 different inhabited planets in the Galactic Empire, all inhabited by humans in Asimov's "human galaxy" scenario.
 Genocide/Famine: 55 million is an estimated upper bound for the death toll of the Great Chinese Famine.
 War: 70 to 85 million casualties estimated as a result of World War II.
 Mathematics: 73,939,133 is the largest right-truncatable prime.

108
(long and short scales: one hundred million)
 Demography: The population of the Philippines was 100,981,437 in 2015.
 Internet – YouTube: The number of YouTube channels is estimated to be 113.9 million.
 Info – Books: The British Library claims that it holds over 150 million items. The Library of Congress claims that it holds approximately 148 million items. See The Gutenberg Galaxy.
 Video gaming: , approximately 200 million copies of Minecraft (the most-sold video game in history) have been sold.
 Mathematics: More than 215,000,000 mathematical constants are collected on the Plouffe's Inverter .
 Mathematics: 275,305,224 is the number of 5×5 normal magic squares, not counting rotations and reflections. This result was found in 1973 by Richard Schroeppel.
Demography: The population of the United States was 328,239,523 in 2019.
 Mathematics: 358,833,097 stellations of the rhombic triacontahedron.
 Info – Web sites: , the Netcraft web survey estimates that there are 525,998,433 (526 million) distinct websites.
 Astronomy – Cataloged stars: The Guide Star Catalog II has entries on 998,402,801 distinct astronomical objects.

109

(10003; short scale: one billion; long scale: one thousand million, or one milliard)

ISO: giga- (G)
 Demography: The population of Africa reached 1,000,000,000 sometime in 2009.
 Demographics – India: 1,381,000,000 – approximate population of India in 2020.
Transportation – Cars: , there are approximately 1.4 billion cars in the world, corresponding to around 18% of the human population.
 Demographics – China: 1,439,000,000 – approximate population of the People's Republic of China in 2020.
Internet – Google: There are more than 1,500,000,000 active Gmail users globally.
 Internet: Approximately 1,500,000,000 active users were on Facebook as of October 2015.
 Computing – Computational limit of a 32-bit CPU: 2,147,483,647 is equal to 231−1, and as such is the largest number which can fit into a signed (two's complement) 32-bit integer on a computer.
 Computing – UTF-8: 2,147,483,648 (231) possible code points (U+0000 - U+7FFFFFFF) in the pre-2003 version of UTF-8 (including five- and six-byte sequences), before the UTF-8 code space was limited to the much smaller set of values encodable in UTF-16.
 Biology – base pairs in the genome: approximately 3.3 base pairs in the human genome.
 Linguistics: 3,400,000,000 – the total number of speakers of Indo-European languages, of which 2,400,000,000 are native speakers;  the other 1,000,000,000 speak Indo-European languages as a second language.
 Mathematics and computing: 4,294,967,295 (232 − 1), the product of the five known Fermat primes and the maximum value for a 32-bit unsigned integer in computing.
 Computing – IPv4: 4,294,967,296 (232) possible unique IP addresses.
 Computing: 4,294,967,296 – the number of bytes in 4 gibibytes; in computation, 32-bit computers can directly access 232 units (bytes) of address space, which leads directly to the 4-gigabyte limit on main memory.
 Mathematics: 4,294,967,297 is a Fermat number and semiprime. It is the smallest number of the form  which is not a prime number.
 Demographics – world population: 8,000,000,000 – Estimated population for the world as of November 2022.

1010
(short scale: ten billion; long scale: ten thousand million, or ten milliard)
 Biology – bacteria in the human body: There are roughly 1010 bacteria in the human mouth.
 Computing – web pages: approximately 5.6 web pages indexed by Google as of 2010.

1011
(short scale: one hundred billion; long scale: hundred thousand million, or hundred milliard)

 Astronomy: There are 100 billion planets located in the Milky Way.
 Biology – Neurons in the brain: approximately (1±0.2) × 1011 neurons in the human brain.
 Medicine: The United States Food and Drug Administration requires a minimum of 3 x 1011 (300 billion) platelets per apheresis unit.
 Paleodemography – Number of humans that have ever lived: approximately (1.2±0.3) × 1011  live births of anatomically modern humans since the beginning of the Upper Paleolithic.
 Astronomy – stars in our galaxy: of the order of 1011 stars in the Milky Way galaxy.

1012

(10004; short scale: one trillion; long scale: one billion)

ISO: tera- (T)
 Astronomy: Andromeda Galaxy, which is part of the same Local Group as our galaxy, contains about 1012 stars.
 Biology – Bacteria on the human body: The surface of the human body houses roughly 1012 bacteria.
  Astronomy – Galaxies: A 2016 estimate says there are 2 × 1012 galaxies in the observable universe.
 Biology – Blood cells in the human body: The average human body has 2.5 × 1012 red blood cells.
 Biology: An estimate says there were 3.04 × 1012 trees on Earth in 2015.
 Marine biology: 3,500,000,000,000 (3.5 × 1012) – estimated population of fish in the ocean.

 Mathematics: 7,625,597,484,987 – a number that often appears when dealing with powers of 3.
 Astronomy: A light-year, as defined by the International Astronomical Union (IAU), is the distance that light travels in a vacuum in one year, which is equivalent to about 9.46 trillion kilometers.
 Mathematics: 1013 – The approximate number of known non-trivial zeros of the Riemann zeta function .
 Mathematics – Known digits of π: , the number of known digits of π is 31,415,926,535,897 (the integer part of π).
 Biology – approximately 1014 synapses in the human brain.
 Astronomy: IC 1101, a supergiant elliptical galaxy located inside the Abell 2029 cluster, is estimated to have approximately 100 trillion (1014) stars inside the galaxy, making it the largest known galaxy in the universe.
 Biology – Cells in the human body: The human body consists of roughly 1014 cells, of which only 1013 are human. The remaining 90% non-human cells (though much smaller and constituting much less mass) are bacteria, which mostly reside in the gastrointestinal tract, although the skin is also covered in bacteria.
 Cryptography: 150,738,274,937,250 configurations of the plug-board of the Enigma machine used by the Germans in WW2 to encode and decode messages by cipher.
 Computing – MAC-48: 281,474,976,710,656 (248) possible unique physical addresses.
 Mathematics: 953,467,954,114,363 is the largest known Motzkin prime.

1015

(10005; short scale: one quadrillion; long scale: one thousand billion, or one billiard)

ISO: peta- (P)
 Biology – Insects: 1,000,000,000,000,000 to 10,000,000,000,000,000 (1015 to 1016) – The estimated total number of ants on Earth alive at any one time (their biomass is approximately equal to the total biomass of the human species).
 Computing: 9,007,199,254,740,992 (253) – number until which all integer values can exactly be represented in IEEE double precision floating-point format.
 Mathematics: 48,988,659,276,962,496 is the fifth taxicab number.
 Science Fiction: In Isaac Asimov's Galactic Empire, in what we call 22,500 CE, there are 25,000,000 different inhabited planets in the Galactic Empire, all inhabited by humans in Asimov's "human galaxy" scenario, each with an average population of 2,000,000,000, thus yielding a total Galactic Empire population of approximately 50,000,000,000,000,000.
 Science Fiction: There are approximately 1017 sentient beings in the Star Wars galaxy.
 Cryptography: There are 256 = 72,057,594,037,927,936 different possible keys in the obsolete 56-bit DES symmetric cipher.

1018

(10006; short scale: one quintillion; long scale: one trillion)

ISO: exa- (E)
 Mathematics: Goldbach's conjecture has been verified for all n ≤ 4 by a project which computed all prime numbers up to that limit.
 Computing – Manufacturing: An estimated 6 transistors were produced worldwide in 2008.
 Computing – Computational limit of a 64-bit CPU: 9,223,372,036,854,775,807 (about 9.22) is equal to 263−1, and as such is the largest number which can fit into a signed (two's complement) 64-bit integer on a computer.
 Mathematics – NCAA basketball tournament: There are 9,223,372,036,854,775,808 (263) possible ways to enter the bracket.
 Mathematics – Bases: 9,439,829,801,208,141,318 (≈9.44) is the 10th and (by conjecture) largest number with more than one digit that can be written from base 2 to base 18 using only the digits 0 to 9, meaning the digits for 10 to 17 are not needed in bases above 10.
 Biology – Insects: It has been estimated that the insect population of the Earth is about 1019.
 Mathematics – Answer to the wheat and chessboard problem: When doubling the grains of wheat on each successive square of a chessboard, beginning with one grain of wheat on the first square, the final number of grains of wheat on all 64 squares of the chessboard when added up is 264−1 = 18,446,744,073,709,551,615 (≈1.84).
 Mathematics – Legends: The Tower of Brahma legend tells about a Hindu temple containing a large room with three posts, on one of which are 64 golden discs, and the object of the mathematical game is for the Brahmins in this temple to move all of the discs to another pole so that they are in the same order, never placing a larger disc above a smaller disc, moving only one at a time. Using the simplest algorithm for moving the disks, it would take 264−1 = 18,446,744,073,709,551,615 (≈1.84) turns to complete the task (the same number as the wheat and chessboard problem above).<ref>Ivan Moscovich, 1000 playthinks: puzzles, paradoxes, illusions & games, Workman Pub., 2001 .</ref>
 Computing – IPv6: 18,446,744,073,709,551,616 (264; ≈1.84) possible unique /64 subnetworks.
 Mathematics – Rubik's Cube: There are 43,252,003,274,489,856,000 (≈4.33) different positions of a 3×3×3 Rubik's Cube.
 Password strength: Usage of the 95-character set found on standard computer keyboards for a 10-character password yields a computationally intractable 59,873,693,923,837,890,625 (9510, approximately 5.99) permutations.
 Economics: Hyperinflation in Zimbabwe estimated in February 2009 by some economists at 10 sextillion percent, or a factor of 1020.

1021

(10007; short scale: one sextillion; long scale: one thousand trillion, or one trilliard)

ISO: zetta- (Z)
 Geo – Grains of sand: All the world's beaches combined have been estimated to hold roughly 1021 grains of sand.
 Computing – Manufacturing: Intel predicted that there would be 1.2 transistors in the world by 2015 and Forbes estimated that 2.9 transistors had been shipped up to 2014.
 Mathematics – Sudoku: There are 6,670,903,752,021,072,936,960 (≈6.7) 9×9 sudoku grids.
 Astronomy – Stars: 70 sextillion = 7, the estimated number of stars within range of telescopes (as of 2003).
 Astronomy – Stars: in the range of 1023 to 1024 stars in the observable universe.
 Mathematics: 146,361,946,186,458,562,560,000 (≈1.5) is the fifth unitary perfect number.
 Mathematics: 357,686,312,646,216,567,629,137 (≈3.6) is the largest left-truncatable prime.
 Chemistry – Physics: The Avogadro constant is the number of constituents (e.g. atoms or molecules) in one mole of a substance, defined for convenience as expressing the order of magnitude separating the molecular from the macroscopic scale.

1024
(10008; short scale: one septillion; long scale: one quadrillion)

ISO: yotta- (Y)
 Mathematics: 2,833,419,889,721,787,128,217,599 (≈2.8) is the fifth Woodall prime.
 Mathematics: 3,608,528,850,368,400,786,036,725 (≈3.6) is the largest polydivisible number.
 Mathematics: 286 = 77,371,252,455,336,267,181,195,264 is the largest known power of two not containing the digit '0' in its decimal representation.

1027
(10009; short scale: one octillion; long scale: one thousand quadrillion, or one quadrilliard)

ISO: ronna- (R)

 Biology – Atoms in the human body: the average human body contains roughly 7 atoms.
 Mathematics – Poker: the number of unique combinations of hands and shared cards in a 10-player game of Texas hold 'em is approximately 2.117.

1030

(100010; short scale: one nonillion; long scale: one quintillion)

ISO: quetta- (Q)

 Biology – Bacterial cells on Earth: The number of bacterial cells on Earth is estimated at 5,000,000,000,000,000,000,000,000,000,000, or 5 × 1030.
 Mathematics: 5,000,000,000,000,000,000,000,000,000,027 is the largest quasi-minimal prime.
 Mathematics: The number of partitions of 1000 is 24,061,467,864,032,622,473,692,149,727,991.
 Mathematics: 368 = 278,128,389,443,693,511,257,285,776,231,761 is the largest known power of three not containing the digit '0' in its decimal representation.
 Mathematics: 2108 = 324,518,553,658,426,726,783,156,020,576,256 is the largest known power of two not containing the digit '9' in its decimal representation.

1033
(100011; short scale: one decillion; long scale: one thousand quintillion, or one quintilliard)
 Mathematics – Alexander's Star: There are 72,431,714,252,715,638,411,621,302,272,000,000 (about 7.24) different positions of Alexander's Star.

1036
(100012; short scale: one undecillion; long scale: one sextillion)
 Mathematics: 227−1 − 1 = 170,141,183,460,469,231,731,687,303,715,884,105,727 (≈1.7) is the largest known double Mersenne prime.
 Computing: 2128 = 340,282,366,920,938,463,463,374,607,431,768,211,456 (≈3.40282367), the theoretical maximum number of Internet addresses that can be allocated under the IPv6 addressing system, one more than the largest value that can be represented by a single-precision IEEE floating-point value, the total number of different Universally Unique Identifiers (UUIDs) that can be generated.
 Cryptography: 2128 = 340,282,366,920,938,463,463,374,607,431,768,211,456 (≈3.40282367), the total number of different possible keys in the AES 128-bit key space (symmetric cipher).

1039
(100013; short scale: one duodecillion; long scale: one thousand sextillion, or one sextilliard)
 Cosmology: The Eddington–Dirac number is roughly 1040.
 Mathematics: 97# × 25 × 33 × 5 × 7 = 69,720,375,229,712,477,164,533,808,935,312,303,556,800 (≈6.97) is the least common multiple of every integer from 1 to 100.

1042 to 10100
(100014; short scale: one tredecillion; long scale: one septillion)
 Mathematics: 141×2141+1 = 393,050,634,124,102,232,869,567,034,555,427,371,542,904,833 (≈3.93) is the second Cullen prime.
 Mathematics: There are 7,401,196,841,564,901,869,874,093,974,498,574,336,000,000,000 (≈7.4) possible permutations for the Rubik's Revenge (4×4×4 Rubik's Cube).

 Chess: 4.52 is a proven upper bound for the number of legal chess positions.
 Geo: 1.33 is the estimated number of atoms in Earth.
 Mathematics: 2168 = 374,144,419,156,711,147,060,143,317,175,368,453,031,918,731,001,856 is the largest known power of two which is not pandigital: There is no digit '2' in its decimal representation.
 Mathematics: 3106 = 375,710,212,613,636,260,325,580,163,599,137,907,799,836,383,538,729 is the largest known power of three which is not pandigital: There is no digit '4'.
 Mathematics: 808,017,424,794,512,875,886,459,904,961,710,757,005,754,368,000,000,000 (≈8.08) is the order of the monster group.
 Cryptography: 2192 = 6,277,101,735,386,680,763,835,789,423,207,666,416,102,355,444,464,034,512,896 (6.27710174), the total number of different possible keys in the AES 192-bit key space (symmetric cipher).
 Cosmology: 8 is roughly the number of Planck time intervals since the universe is theorised to have been created in the Big Bang 13.799 ± 0.021 billion years ago.
 Cosmology: 1 is Archimedes' estimate in The Sand Reckoner of the total number of grains of sand that could fit into the entire cosmos, the diameter of which he estimated in stadia to be what we call 2 light-years.
 Mathematics – Cards: 52! = 80,658,175,170,943,878,571,660,636,856,403,766,975,289,505,440,883,277,824,000,000,000,000 (≈8.07) – the number of ways to order the cards in a 52-card deck.
 Mathematics: There are ≈1.01×1068 possible combinations for the Megaminx.
 Mathematics: 1,808,422,353,177,349,564,546,512,035,512,530,001,279,481,259,854,248,860,454,348,989,451,026,887 (≈1.81) – The largest known prime factor found by ECM factorization .
 Mathematics: There are 282,870,942,277,741,856,536,180,333,107,150,328,293,127,731,985,672,134,721,536,000,000,000,000,000 (≈2.83) possible permutations for the Professor's Cube (5×5×5 Rubik's Cube).
 Cryptography: 2256 =  115,792,089,237,316,195,423,570,985,008,687,907,853,269,984,665,640,564,039,457,584,007,913,129,639,936 (≈1.15792089), the total number of different possible keys in the AES 256-bit key space (symmetric cipher).
 Cosmology: Various sources estimate the total number of fundamental particles in the observable universe to be within the range of 1080 to 1085.WMAP- Content of the Universe . Map.gsfc.nasa.gov (2010-04-16). Retrieved on 2011-05-01. However, these estimates are generally regarded as guesswork. (Compare the Eddington number, the estimated total number of protons in the observable universe.)
 Computing: 9.999 999 is equal to the largest value that can be represented in the IEEE decimal32 floating-point format.
 Computing: 69! (roughly 1.7112245), is the highest factorial value that can be represented on a calculator with two digits for powers of ten without overflow.
 Mathematics: One googol, 1, 1 followed by one hundred zeros, or 10,000,000,000,000,000,000,000,000,000,000,000,000,000,000,000,000,000,000,000,000,000,000,000,000,000,000,000,000,000,000,000,000,000.

10100 (one googol) to 101000

(short scale: ten duotrigintillion; long scale: ten thousand sexdecillion, or ten sexdecillard)

 Mathematics: There are 157 152 858 401 024 063 281 013 959 519 483 771 508 510 790 313 968 742 344 694 684 829 502 629 887 168 573 442 107 637 760 000 000 000 000 000 000 000 000 (≈1.57) distinguishable permutations of the V-Cube 6 (6×6×6 Rubik's Cube).
 Chess: Shannon number, 10120, a lower bound of the game-tree complexity of chess.
 Physics: 10120, discrepancy between the observed value of the cosmological constant and a naive estimate based on Quantum Field Theory and the Planck energy.
 Physics: 8, ratio of the mass-energy in the observable universe to the energy of a photon with a wavelength the size of the observable universe.
 Mathematics: 19 568 584 333 460 072 587 245 340 037 736 278 982 017 213 829 337 604 336 734 362 294 738 647 777 395 483 196 097 971 852 999 259 921 329 236 506 842 360 439 300 (≈1.96) is the period of primary pretenders.
 History – Religion: Asaṃkhyeya is a Buddhist name for the number 10140. It is listed in the Avatamsaka Sutra and metaphorically means "innumerable" in the Sanskrit language of ancient India.
 Xiangqi: 10150, an estimation of the game-tree complexity of xiangqi.
 Mathematics: There are 19 500 551 183 731 307 835 329 126 754 019 748 794 904 992 692 043 434 567 152 132 912 323 232 706 135 469 180 065 278 712 755 853 360 682 328 551 719 137 311 299 993 600 000 000 000 000 000 000 000 000 000 000 000 (≈1.95) distinguishable permutations of the V-Cube 7 (7×7×7 Rubik's Cube).

 Go: There are 208 168 199 381 979 984 699 478 633 344 862 770 286 522 453 884 530 548 425 639 456 820 927 419 612 738 015 378 525 648 451 698 519 643 907 259 916 015 628 128 546 089 888 314 427 129 715 319 317 557 736 620 397 247 064 840 935 (≈2.08) legal positions in the game of Go. See Go and mathematics.
 Economics: The annualized rate of the hyperinflation in Hungary in 1946 was estimated to be 2.9%. It was the most extreme case of hyperinflation ever recorded.
 Board games: 3.457, number of ways to arrange the tiles in English Scrabble on a standard 15-by-15 Scrabble board.
 Physics: 10186, approximate number of Planck volumes in the observable universe.
 Shogi: 10226, an estimation of the game-tree complexity of shogi.
 Physics: 7, approximate spacetime volume of the history of the observable universe in Planck units.
 Computing: 1.797 693 134 862 315 807 is approximately equal to the largest value that can be represented in the IEEE double precision floating-point format.
 Computing: (10 – 10−15) is equal to the largest value that can be represented in the IEEE decimal64 floating-point format.
 Mathematics: 997# × 31# × 25 × 34 × 54 × 7 = 7 128 865 274 665 093 053 166 384 155 714 272 920 668 358 861 885 893 040 452 001 991 154 324 087 581 111 499 476 444 151 913 871 586 911 717 817 019 575 256 512 980 264 067 621 009 251 465 871 004 305 131 072 686 268 143 200 196 609 974 862 745 937 188 343 705 015 434 452 523 739 745 298 963 145 674 982 128 236 956 232 823 794 011 068 809 262 317 708 861 979 540 791 247 754 558 049 326 475 737 829 923 352 751 796 735 248 042 463 638 051 137 034 331 214 781 746 850 878 453 485 678 021 888 075 373 249 921 995 672 056 932 029 099 390 891 687 487 672 697 950 931 603 520 000 (≈7.13) is the	least common multiple of every integer from 1 to 1000.

101000 to 1010100 (one googolplex)

 Mathematics: There are approximately 1.869 distinguishable permutations of the world's largest Rubik's Cube (33×33×33).
 Computing: 1.189 731 495 357 231 765 05 is approximately equal to the largest value that can be represented in the IEEE 80-bit x86 extended precision floating-point format.
 Computing: 1.189 731 495 357 231 765 085 759 326 628 007 0 is approximately equal to the largest value that can be represented in the IEEE quadruple-precision floating-point format.
 Computing: (10 – 10−33) is equal to the largest value that can be represented in the IEEE decimal128 floating-point format.
 Computing: 1010,000 − 1 is equal to the largest value that can be represented in Windows Phone's calculator.
 Mathematics: 26384405 + 44052638 is a 15,071-digit Leyland prime; the largest which has been proven .
 Mathematics: 3,756,801,695,685 × 2666,669 ± 1 are 200,700-digit twin primes; the largest known .
 Mathematics: 18,543,637,900,515 × 2666,667 − 1 is a 200,701-digit Sophie Germain prime; the largest known .
 Mathematics: approximately 7.76 × 10206,544 cattle in the smallest herd which satisfies the conditions of Archimedes's cattle problem.
 Mathematics: 10474,500 + 999 × 10237,249 + 1 is a 474,501-digit palindromic prime, the largest known .
 Mathematics: 2,996,863,034,895 × 21,290,000±1 are 388,342-digit twin primes; the largest known .
 Mathematics: 1,098,133# – 1 is a 476,311-digit primorial prime; the largest known .
 Mathematics: 208,003! − 1 is a 1,015,843-digit factorial prime; the largest known .
 Mathematics – Literature: Jorge Luis Borges' Library of Babel contains at least 251,312,000 ≈ 1.956 × 101,834,097 books (this is a lower bound).
 Mathematics: 4 × 721,119,849 − 1 is the smallest prime of the form 4×72n−1 
 Mathematics: (215,135,397+1)/3 is a 4,556,209-digit Wagstaff probable prime, the largest known .
 Mathematics: 1,059,0941,048,576 + 1 is a 6,317,602-digit Generalized Fermat prime, the largest known .
 Mathematics: (108,177,207−1)/9 is a 8,177,207-digit probable prime, the largest known .
 Mathematics: 10,223 × 231,172,165 + 1 is a 9,383,761-digit Proth prime, the largest known Proth prime and non-Mersenne prime .

 Mathematics: 282,589,933 − 1 is a 24,862,048-digit Mersenne prime; the largest known prime of any kind .
 Mathematics: 282,589,932 × (282,589,933 − 1) is a 49,724,095-digit perfect number, the largest known as of 2020.
 Mathematics – History: 108×1016, largest named number in Archimedes' Sand Reckoner.
 Mathematics: 10googol, a googolplex. A number 1 followed by 1 googol zeros. Carl Sagan has estimated that 1 googolplex, fully written out, would not fit in the observable universe because of its size, while also noting that one could also write the number as 1010100.

Larger than 1010100
(One googolplex; 10googol; short scale: googolplex; long scale: googolplex)
 Cosmology:  In chaotic inflation theory, proposed by physicist Andrei Linde, our universe is one of many other universes with different physical constants that originated as part of our local section of the multiverse, owing to a vacuum that had not decayed to its ground state.
 Mathematics: , order of magnitude of an upper bound that occurred in a proof of Skewes (this was later estimated to be closer to 1.397 × 10316).Cosmology: The estimated number of Planck time units for quantum fluctuations and tunnelling to generate a new Big Bang is estimated to be .
 Mathematics: , a number in the googol family called a googolplexplex, googolplexian, or googolduplex. 1 followed by a googolplex zeros, or 10googolplexCosmology: The uppermost estimate to the size of the entire universe is approximately  times that of the observable universe.
 Mathematics: , order of magnitude of another upper bound in a proof of Skewes.
 Mathematics: , a number in the googol family called a googolplexplexplex, googolplexianth, or googoltriplex. 1 followed by a googolduplex zeros, or 10googolduplex
 Mathematics: Steinhaus' mega lies between 10[4]257 and 10[4]258 (where a[n]b is hyperoperation).
 Mathematics: Moser's number, "2 in a mega-gon" in Steinhaus–Moser notation, is approximately equal to 10[10[4]257]10, the last four digits are ...1056.
 Mathematics: Graham's number, the last ten digits of which are ...2464195387, equals 3[3[3[...3[3[3[6]3+2]3+2]3...]3+2]3+2]3 with 64 levels of brackets. Arises as an upper bound solution to a problem in Ramsey theory. Representation in powers of 10 would be impractical (the number of 10s in the power tower  would be virtually indistinguishable from the number itself).
 Mathematics: TREE(3): appears in relation to a theorem on trees in graph theory.  Representation of the number is difficult, but one weak lower bound is  AA(187196)(1), where A(n) is a version of the Ackermann function.
 Mathematics: SSCG(3): appears in relation to the Robertson–Seymour theorem.  Known to be greater than TREE(3).
 Mathematics: Transcendental integers: a set of numbers defined in 2000 by Harvey Friedman, appears in proof theory.
 Mathematics:'' Rayo's number is a large number named after Agustín Rayo which has been claimed to be the largest number to have ever been named. It was originally defined in a "big number duel" at MIT on 26 January 2007.

See also

 Conway chained arrow notation
 Encyclopedic size comparisons on Wikipedia
 Fast-growing hierarchy
 Indian numbering system
 Large numbers
 List of numbers
 Mathematical constant
 Names of large numbers
 Names of small numbers
 Power of 10

References

External links
 Seth Lloyd's paper Computational capacity of the universe provides a number of interesting dimensionless quantities.
 Notable properties of specific numbers
 

Numbers